Pincay is a surname. Notable people with the surname include:

Laffit Pincay Jr. (born 1946), American jockey
Patricia Pincay (born 1978), Ecuadorian footballer